Father Francis Kline, OCSO, was the third Abbot of Mepkin Abbey until his death on August 27, 2006.
He is buried at Mepkin Abbey in Moncks Corner, South Carolina. He was a graduate of the Juilliard School in New York and he was a skilled organist. He was in the process of trying to make the abbey more self-sufficient.

References

External links
In Memoriam: Dom Francis Kline OCSO

American abbots
2006 deaths
Year of birth missing